Alfonso Feijoo García (born in San Sebastián, 5 January 1953) is a former Spanish rugby union footballer and a current coach. He's also a Physical Education teacher in San Sebastián.

Feijoo had 23 caps for Spain, during his career. He later become a rugby union coach, taking office as head coach of Spain, in 1997. He achieved his country first ever qualification for the Rugby World Cup finals. Spain played in the 1999 Rugby World Cup finals, but lost all the three matches.

He was elected President of the Spanish Rugby Federation at May 2014.

References

External links
Profile of Alfonso Feijoo

1953 births
Living people
Spanish rugby union players
Spanish rugby union coaches
Rugby union centres
Spain international rugby union players
Rugby union players from the Basque Country (autonomous community)
Sportspeople from San Sebastián